Wheeler Lake is located in the northern part of the state of Alabama in the United States, between Rogersville and Huntsville. Created by Wheeler Dam along the Tennessee River, it stretches  from Wheeler Dam to Guntersville Dam.

Decatur operates the busiest port along the Tennessee River on this lake, Port of Decatur.

Wheeler Lake is a major recreation and tourist center, attracting about four million visits a year. Along with camping, boating, and fishing, visitors enjoy the Wheeler National Wildlife Refuge several miles upstream from the dam.

The lake and dam are named for General Joseph "Joe" Wheeler.

See also
Dams and reservoirs of the Tennessee River
List of Alabama dams and reservoirs

References

External links
Fishing Wheeler Lake Largemouth bass, smallmouth bass, striped bass and crappie.

Reservoirs in Alabama
Tennessee River
Decatur, Alabama
Bodies of water of Morgan County, Alabama
Bodies of water of Limestone County, Alabama
Bodies of water of Lawrence County, Alabama
Bodies of water of Lauderdale County, Alabama
Tennessee Valley Authority
Decatur metropolitan area, Alabama
Huntsville-Decatur, AL Combined Statistical Area
Landmarks in Alabama